James Nares may refer to:

James Nares (artist) (born 1953), British artist
James Nares (composer) (born 1715), English composer

See also 
James Naremore